Columbia Township is one of the twelve townships of Hamilton County, Ohio, United States.  The 2020 census found 4,446 people in the township. Originally one of Ohio's largest townships by area at its inception in 1791, it gradually shrank to one of the smallest by the early 1950s.

Name
Columbia Township is named after Columbia, the first white settlement in the historical Miami Valley, near Cincinnati Municipal Lunken Airport and now part of Cincinnati's Columbia-Tusculum neighborhood. Statewide, other Columbia Townships are located in Lorain and Meigs counties.

History
Columbia Township was formed in 1791, a year after Hamilton County was organized, when the court of general quarter sessions of the peace divided the southern part of the county into Columbia, Cincinnati, and Miami townships, each extending from the Ohio River north past the present-day Butler County line. Each township was assigned a standard cattle brand; historians have considered Columbia Township to be the county's first township, on account of its cattle brand of "A". The township's boundaries were defined as:

Columbia Township was one of the largest townships in Ohio, larger than some present-day counties. The three townships included virtually all the white residents of the Symmes Purchase; in the midst of the Northwest Indian War, conflicts with indigenous peoples continued to take place to the north until the Treaty of Greenville.

The township gradually shrank as Hamilton County's population grew. In 1795, upon the signing of the Treaty of Greenville, the court of general quarter sessions of the peace created Deerfield and Dayton townships out of the northern reaches of Columbia Township. In 1803, the county commissioners created Sycamore Township from the northern half of Columbia Township and, in turn, created Symmes Township from Sycamore Township's eastern half between 1820 and 1826. In the early 1840s, Spencer Township was carved out of the southwestern part of Columbia Township.

In 1876, Madisonville became the first village to incorporate within the township, followed by Norwood in 1881, Pleasant Ridge in 1891, and Terrace Park in 1893. The township's population grew further as the Cincinnati Street Railway extended lines further into the suburbs between 1890 and 1910. Cincinnati annexed Madisonville, Pleasant Ridge, Oakley, and Kennedy Heights between 1911 and 1914.

From the 1920s, car ownership spurred additional growth in the southwestern corner of the township. Mariemont was developed as a car-centric community in 1922. The completion of Columbia Parkway in 1938 caused Cincinnati to annex surrounding unincorporated land, leading Indian Hill and Mariemont to incorporate as villages in 1941, followed by Fairfax in 1951. Unlike in other parts of Ohio, most villages in southwestern Ohio withdrew from their surrounding townships via paper townships, reducing the township to one of the smallest in Ohio by the early 1950s. One exception was Fairfax, which only withdrew on January 1, 2010, due in part to city residents' low tax contribution compared to their influence on township elections.

Columbia Township invested $75,000 through its partnership to support Mariemont’s development of the next segment of the Murray Path extension.  In 2021 the path will be extended from Settle Rd. east to Plainville Rd. at the southern gateway to Columbia’s Plainville Business District and historic Madison Place neighborhood.

Geography
Located in the eastern part of Hamilton County, Ohio, the township currently consists of eight disconnected parcels:

 The largest parcel is the Ridge & Highland/Red Bank area.  Its western part contains several big-box stores, its central part mainly contains a segment of Interstate 71, and its eastern part contains a few residential subdivisions.  It is mostly surrounded by the Cincinnati neighborhoods of Kennedy Heights, Pleasant Ridge, and Madisonville, but is bordered by Silverton and Madeira to the northeast.
 Norwood Green is the westernmost parcel, consisting mainly of Fenwick Park.  It is bordered by Norwood to the south and Pleasant Ridge in Cincinnati to the north.
 Ridgewood contains a residential subdivision.  It is bordered by Amberley to the north and east, Pleasant Ridge in Cincinnati to the south, and Golf Manor to the west.
 The Stewart Road Area is the northernmost parcel, containing residences.  It borders Sycamore Township on the north, Madeira to the east, and Silverton to the west
 The Camargo Road Area is mostly wooded with a few residences on its eastern fringe.  It is bordered by Madeira to the north, Indian Hill to the east, and Madisonville in Cincinnati to the west.
 Madison Place covers two parcels each of which is a residential subdivision.  These border Indian Hill to the east, Madisonville in Cincinnati to the west, and Mariemont to the south.
 Plainville is a fairly large parcel that stretches along the northern bank of the Little Miami River; it contains a commercial district and some residential subdivisions in its central portion, but is otherwise mainly undeveloped.  It borders Fairfax to the west, Mariemont and Indian Hill to the north, Terrace Park to the east, and Anderson Township to the south.
 Camp Dennison, the northeasternmost parcel, is mostly wooded but contains a public works facility of the Village of Indian Hill.  It is bordered by the separate Camp Dennison CDP in Symmes Township to the north, Miami Township, Clermont County to the east, Milford to the south, and Indian Hill to the west.

The former extent of Columbia Township is now largely occupied by the following municipalities:

Some of the remaining township (only about 2.5 sq mi (6 km) in area) is land that is unsuitable for development, especially the banks of the Little Miami River.

Government
The township is governed by a three-member board of trustees, who are elected in November of odd-numbered years to a four-year term beginning on the following January 1. Two are elected in the year after the presidential election and one is elected in the year before it. There is also an elected township fiscal officer, who serves a four-year term beginning on April 1 of the year after the election, which is held in November of the year before the presidential election. Vacancies in the fiscal officership or on the board of trustees are filled by the remaining trustees.

Joint Economic Development Zone (JEDZ) 
On November 5, 2013, the residents of Columbia Township voted to establish a Joint Economic Development Zone (JEDZ) and to implement an earnings tax on individuals working in the Zone and on net profits from businesses in the Zone, in partnership with the Village of Fairfax.

References

Further reading

External links 
Township website
County website

Townships in Hamilton County, Ohio
Townships in Ohio